The 2010–11 Washington State Cougars men's basketball team represented Washington State University during the 2010–11 NCAA Division I men's basketball season. The team played its home games on Jack Friel Court at Beasley Coliseum in Pullman, Washington and are members of the Pacific-10 Conference. They were led by second year head coach Ken Bone. They finished the season 22–13, 9–9 in Pac-10 play and lost in the quarterfinals of the 2011 Pacific-10 Conference men's basketball tournament to rival Washington. They were invited to the 2011 National Invitation Tournament where they advanced to the semifinals in Madison Square Garden where they lost to Wichita State.

Roster

Schedule

|-
!colspan=9 style=| Exhibition

|-
!colspan=9 style=| Regular season

|-
!colspan=9 style=| Pac-10 tournament

|-
!colspan=9 style=| NIT

Notes
 December 29, 2010 – Washington State kicks off Pac-10 play at UCLA in Pauley Pavilion.
 January 15, 2011 – Reggie Moore was suspended for one game on January 15 after being arrested for possession of marijuana and drug paraphernalia.
 March 5, 2011 – Klay Thompson was suspended for one game on March 5 after being issued a misdemeanor criminal citation for marijuana possession.
 March 12, 2011 – Thompson was named to the Pac-10 All Tournament Team.
 March 13, 2011 – The Cougars were selected to participate in the 2011 NIT to play Long Beach State on March 16, 2011.
 March 22, 2011 – DeAngelo Casto was suspended for the NIT Quarterfinals against Northwestern on March 22 for being cited with possession of marijuana but would later have his suspension lifted when Athletic Director Bill Moos said that "new information prompted him to lift the suspension."

References

External links
 Washington State men's basketball site 

Washington State Cougars men's basketball seasons
Washington State Cougars
Washington State
Washington State
Washington State